Susan Huber is an American voice actress who works with anime series at FUNimation Entertainment. She has provided voices for a number of English-language versions of Japanese anime films.

She is not related to fellow FUNimation voice actor Chuck Huber.

She is sometimes credited as Lucy Small.

Anime
 Case Closed - Laurel Hallerand, Nora Odell, Karen Hotta, Crystal Lemin, Murisa Noble
 Dragon Ball series - Pan (Z), Videl (GT), Suno, Chow (Dragon Ball & Z)
 Fullmetal Alchemist: Brotherhood - Satera
 The Galaxy Railways - Kate
 Lupin III - Sandy (Missed by a Dollar), Maria Isshiki (Crisis in Tokyo)
 Negima! - Madoka Kugimiya (Season 1, credited as Lucy Small)
 Samurai 7 - Chiaki
 Yu Yu Hakusho - Yukina, Sayaka, Rui

External links
 
 Susan Huber * Voice Over

Living people
American voice actresses
Radio Disney DJs
American women radio presenters
1971 births